János Bogár (born July 26, 1964, in Miskolc, Hungary) is a Hungarian ultramarathon runner.

Ultramarathon career highlights  

Bogár has set and held national records in nearly all Hungarian ultramarathon events in which he has competed. He is the current national record holder in the 100 km and the 24-hour running events.

He is best known for his six victories at the Vienna to Budapest Supermarathon, the most prestigious stage race in Central Europe in the 1990s.

The highlights of his ultramarathon career include his European Championship title in the 24-hour event earned in Szeged, Hungary in 1994, his seven victories at the 100 km of Madrid, six victories at the Vienna to Budapest Supermarathon (1992, 1994- 1998) and one at a popular 245 km race between Athens and Sparta (1991).

In 2007 Bogár was the first runner in the history of ultra-running to come close to beat the world's most notable icon of ultramarathon running, Yiannis Kouros in a 212 km race around Lake Balaton, the largest lake in Central Europe.

For his sportsmanship, Bogár was  awarded the prestigious Fair Play Award presented by the president of the International Committee for Fair Play Jenő Kamuti in 2009.

Personal best performances

Awards 

 Hungarian Ultrarunners' Hall of Fame (2016)
 Nominee for Ultramarathon Life Achievement Award (2011)
 Fair Play Award – presented by President of the International Committee for Fair Play
awarded by Jenő Kamuti. (2009)
 Ultra-runner of the Year 2007 – awarded by the Hungarian Ultra-running Association (2007)

References 

Living people
1964 births
Hungarian ultramarathon runners
Hungarian male long-distance runners
Sportspeople from Miskolc
Male ultramarathon runners